Doi Phu Kha , is a mountain in Southeast Asia, part of the Luang Prabang Range (ทิวเขาหลวงพระบาง).

It is a rugged mountain in a forested area of Nan Province, at the east end of the Thai highlands, 18 km west of the border between Laos and Thailand. The Doi Phu Kha National Park, Northern Thailand's largest national park, is in the area surrounding the mountain.

See also
Doi Phu Kha National Park
List of mountains in Thailand

References

External links

Birdwatching Doi Phu Kha National Park

Mountains of Thailand
Geography of Nan province
Luang Prabang Range